"Ancient History" is a song recorded by Canadian country music group Prairie Oyster. It was released in 1995 as the sixth single from their fourth studio album, Only One Moon. It peaked at number 5 on the RPM Country Tracks chart in January 1996.

It was originally recorded by Pam Tillis on her 1991 album Put Yourself in My Place. Tillis's version was the B-side of the album's last single, "Blue Rose Is".

Chart performance

Year-end charts

References

1991 songs
Pam Tillis songs
1995 singles
Prairie Oyster songs
Arista Nashville singles
Songs written by Bob DiPiero
Songs written by John Scott Sherrill